The Underwriters Salvation Corps of St Louis was created in May 1874 to reduce the loss of property in fires. It was one of several Salvage Corps that formed in the 19th century to deal with fire in growing cities. Members would be part of Fire Patrols that, in the event of a fire, would enter burning structures and remove valuables before the fire could destroy them. This organization helped innovate early fire equipment. The organization "came to a close at the stroke of midnight on December 31, 1955"

Members
Leslie Bright
Charles Henry Campfield
Thomas R. Collins
George T Cram — First President
Charles Evens — First Chief
Frank O Gailey — Deputy Chief
Ernest Hyacinthe Peugnet  — President
John Glanville — Chief and Designer of Special Motor Wagon, and a custom Locomobile   
Thomas M. Gorman — Captain
Joseph Franklin Hickey — Treasurer 
James T O'Donnell — Chief
John J. O'Toole
Frank Roeder — Treasurer
A. H. Schwarz
Raymond W. Smith
Roy W. Smith
Lewis E Snow — First Secretary

References 
 

History of firefighting
History of St. Louis
Salvage corps